Atle is the first  to be delivered from the Wärtsilä Helsinki Shipyard. After sea trials in mid-1974 she was delivered on 21 October. She was then crewed by personnel from the Swedish Navy and on 24 October she set sail for Stockholm.

References 
 Staffan Fischerström, Isbrytare
 Owners site 

Ships built in Helsinki
Icebreakers of Sweden
1974 ships
Atle-class icebreakers